Armağan Ballantyne (born 7 August 1972) is a New Zealand film director. She is best known for her feature films The Strength of Water (2009) and Nude Tuesday (2022).

Biography 

Ballantyne was born in Wellington in 1972. Her first name is Turkish, and was the name of a family friend. In 1996, Ballantyne directed the music video for Emma Paki's "Don't Give It Up", which won an award. Afterwards, Ballantyne studied film in Sydney and Prague. From 2001 to 2002, Ballantyne worked a director for the New Zealand youth television series Being Eve.

In 2009, she released her debut feature film The Strength of Water. Written by Briar Grace-Smith, the film focuses on the story of two Māori youth in rural Hokianga. Her 2018 short film Hush won the award for best director at the Show Me Shorts international short film festival. The film won a number of awards, including Best Feature Film at the Wairoa Māori Film Festival, Antipodean Film Festival, and the Grand Jury prize at the Annonay International Film Festival.

In 2022, Ballantyne released Nude Tuesday, a comedy film performed in a fictional language that Ballantyne had developed and wrote together with lead actress Jackie van Beek.

Filmography

Films

Television

References

1972 births
English-language film directors
Living people
New Zealand film directors
New Zealand screenwriters
New Zealand television directors
New Zealand women film directors
New Zealand women screenwriters
People from Wellington City